Faith Christian School is a K-12 private, non-denominational Protestant school in Williams Bay, Wisconsin, United States.

The school was founded in 1981 and educated several hundred students in a church basement leased from Calvary Community Church in Williams Bay. In 1994 the school purchased property for their own school facilities which were completed in 2002.

References 

Christian schools in Wisconsin
Private high schools in Wisconsin
Schools in Walworth County, Wisconsin
Private middle schools in Wisconsin
Private elementary schools in Wisconsin